Ben F. Wilson (also credited as Benjamin Wilson; July 7, 1876 – August 25, 1930), was an American stage and film actor, director, producer and screenwriter of the silent era. He appeared in more than 210 films between 1911 and 1930. He also directed more than 130 films between 1912 and 1930. He starred as Inspector Cleek in a 1914 series of mystery shorts. He was born in Corning, Iowa in 1876, and died in Glendale, California in 1930 from heart disease.

Selected filmography

 Silver Threads Among the Gold (1911)
 The Star Spangled Banner (1911)
 The Battle of Bunker Hill (1911)
 To Save Her Brother (1912)
 For the Cause of the South (1912)
 The Charge of the Light Brigade (1912)
 The Passing of J.B. Randall and Company (1912)
 In His Father's Steps (1912)
 The Old Monk's Tale (1913)
 The Mystery of the Dover Express (1913)
 The Vanishing Cracksman (1913)
 The Twelfth Juror (1913)
 Hulda of Holland (1913)
 Who Will Marry Mary? (1913)
 The Heritage of Hamilton Cleek (1914)
The Chronicles of Cleek series - (shorts)
 The Mystery of the Sealed Art Gallery (1914)
 The Mystery of the Glass Tubes (1914)
 The Mystery of the Octagonal Room (1914)
 The Mystery of the Lost Stradivarius (1914)
 The Mystery of the Fadeless Tints (1914)
 The Mystery of the Amsterdam Diamonds (1914)
 The Mystery of the Silver Snare (1914)
 The Mystery of the Laughing Death (1914)
 The Mystery of the Ladder of Light (1914)
 The Mystery of the Talking Wire (1914)

 The Mainspring (1916)
 The Cad (1915) (directed and acted)
 Idle Wives (1916)
 Even As You and I (1917)
 The Spindle of Life (1917)
 The Voice on the Wire (1917)
 The Mystery Ship (1917)
 The Brass Bullet (1918)
 The Trail of the Octopus (1919)
 The Blue Bonnet (1919)
 Castles in the Air (1919)
 The Screaming Shadow (1920)
 Thunderbolt Jack (1920)
 Cupid's Brand (1921)
 Dangerous Paths (1921)
 Devil Dog Dawson (1921)
 Cyclone Bliss (1921)
 Dead or Alive (1921)
 The Sheriff of Hope Eternal (1921)
 The Broken Spur (1921)
 Hills of Hate (1921)
 The Double O (1921)
 The Innocent Cheat (1921)
 Back to Yellow Jacket (1922)
 One Eighth Apache (1922)
 Chain Lightning (1922)
 The Love Trap (1923)
 The Satin Girl (1923)
 The Law Rustlers (1923)
 Mine to Keep (1923)
 Other Men's Daughters (1923)
 The Santa Fe Trail (1923)
 Condemned (1923)
 Notch Number One (1924)
 The Desert Hawk (1924)
 Two Fisted Justice (1924)
 Branded a Bandit (1924)
 The Mystery Box (1925)
 White Thunder (1925)
 Wild Horse Canyon (1925)
 A Two-Fisted Sheriff (1925)
 Scar Hanan (1925)
 The Human Tornado (1925)
 A Daughter of the Sioux (1925)
 Vic Dyson Pays (1925)
 Romance and Rustlers (1925)
 Tonio, Son of the Sierras (1925)
 The Fugitive (1925)
 Where Romance Rides (1925)
 The Riding Comet (1925)
 Tentacles of the North (1926)
 The Baited Trap (1926)
 The Wolf Hunters (1926)
 West of the Law (1926)
 Wolves of the Desert (1926)
 Fort Frayne (1926)
 Officer 444 (1926)
 Rainbow Riley (1926)
 The Range Riders (1927)
 Speeding Hoofs (1927)
 The Fighting Stallion (1927)
 Western Courage (1927)
 His Last Bullet (1928)
 Bye, Bye, Buddy (1929)
 The Saddle King (1929)
 The Voice from the Sky (1930)
 Shadow Ranch (1930)

References

External links

1876 births
1930 deaths
20th-century American male actors
American male film actors
American male screenwriters
American male silent film actors
People from Corning, Iowa
Film directors from Iowa
Screenwriters from Iowa
Film producers from Iowa
20th-century American male writers
20th-century American screenwriters